Oladipupo Olarotimi Martins (12 April 1983 – 9 August 2011) was a professional Nigerian footballer who last played as a forward for University of Ado Ekiti, a non professional side.

He died of a suspected heart attack at the Dorel Specialist Hospital, Ajah, Lagos on Monday, 8 August 2011, after being admitted complaining of chest pains the previous day. He was 28.

Career
Martins started his European career with Italian side Reggiana before quickly attracting the attention of Inter Milan whom he signed for in 2001. Unlike his brother, Martins did not thrive at Inter and was released at the end of the 2001–02 season. He returned to Nigeria but soon found himself heading back to Europe, this time for a trial with Serbian side FK Partizan. His hard work was rewarded and in 2003 he signed a professional contract. His opportunities at Partizan were limited and most of his opportunities to play ended up being for the satellite FK Teleoptik. In 2004, he was released from his contract and returned to Nigeria again, this time for an extended period before he finally signing for Austrian side Innsbrucker AC in time for the 2007–08 season after a trial period and joined University of Ado Ekiti in February 2009.

Personal life
Martins was the older brother of Nigerian international striker Obafemi Martins.

References

External links
 Oladipupo Martins at SportBasis

1983 births
2011 deaths
Sportspeople from Lagos
Nigerian footballers
Nigerian expatriate footballers
A.C. Reggiana 1919 players
Inter Milan players
Expatriate footballers in Italy
FK Partizan players
FK Teleoptik players
Expatriate footballers in Serbia and Montenegro
Expatriate footballers in Austria
Nigerian expatriate sportspeople in Austria
Association football forwards
Nigerian expatriate sportspeople in Serbia and Montenegro
NEPA Lagos players